The Goya Award for Best Original Screenplay (Spanish Premio Goya al mejor guión original) is one of the Goya Awards, Spain's principal national film awards. 

For the first two editions of the Goya Awards, only one award for screenplays was presented which included both original and adapted screenplays, with both winners being adaptations, Voyage to Nowhere in 1986 (based on the novel of the same name by Fernando Fernán Gómez) and El bosque animado (based on the eponymous novel by Wenceslao Fernández Flórez) in 1987. Since the third edition, two awards are presented separately, Best Original Screenplay and Best Adapted Screenplay.

Alejandro Amenábar holds the record for most wins in this category with four victories, winning for Tesis (1996), The Others (2001), The Sea Inside (2004) and Agora (2009). Pedro Almodóvar has received more nominations in this category than any other nominee, with seven nominations.

Winners and nominees

1980s
 Best Screenplay

 Best Original Screenplay

1990s

2000s

2010s

2020s

References

External links 
Official site
IMDb: Goya Awards

Original screenplay
Screenwriting awards for film